
From the Coop is Buckethead's third special release. It consists of songs from early demo tapes that Buckethead recorded when he was around 19 years old. A final cassette was made with all 3 demo cassettes put together was made in 2000 for a CD release that wouldn't happen for another 8 years. As with Acoustic Shards, this album is more of a specialty release rather than his latest studio effort.

Track listing

Credits
 Buckethead - Guitar, bass, drum machine
 Jas Obrecht - Producer
 Ken Hood - Audio engineering
 John Edmonds - Original engineer in 1988

References

External links
 Avabella's official Young Buckethead site

2008 albums
Buckethead albums